is a Japanese attorney (Special Counsel of TMI Associates). He was a career judge and a Justice of the Supreme Court of Japan.  Following his retirement, Izumi participated in a public campaign against the re-election of two of his former colleagues, Justices Wakui and Nasu, in protest against the votes they had cast in an electoral malapportionment case.

References

Supreme Court of Japan justices
1939 births
Living people